The 2010–11 season was Exeter's second season in League One, since their promotion the conference in 2009, and their 46th season in the third tier of English football. It was Paul Tisdale's fifth full season in charge at the club.

Squad

Current squad
Updated 27 April 2011.

Competitions

Football League One

Results summary

Fixtures & results

League table

League Cup

Football League Trophy

FA Cup

References

External links

Exeter City F.C. seasons
Exeter City